Maachis is a 1996 Indian period political thriller film written and directed by Gulzar and produced by R. V. Pandit. It stars Chandrachur Singh, Om Puri, Tabu, and Jimmy Sheirgill. The film portrays the circumstances surrounding the rise of the Sikh insurgency in Punjab in the 1980s. The music of the film was composed by Vishal Bhardwaj, with lyrics penned by Gulzar. It was also the Hindi film debut of KK as a playback singer.

The title of the film Maachis is a metaphor that conveys that any nation's youth are like matchsticks, which can be used to light a lamp or a fuse that will blow a dynamite. The film depicts how corrupt political and policing systems implement willful policies and ploys to target and subdue people based on religious discrimination. The protagonist in the film becomes a victim of such atrocities that bring about a transformation in his character. He goes from being an ordinary boy next door to an angry, vengeful person who pursues his version of justice, as the system responsible for it has failed him.

At the 44th National Film Awards, Maachis won 2 awards – Best Popular Film Providing Wholesome Entertainment and Best Actress (Tabu). At the 42nd Filmfare Awards, the film received 10 nominations, including Best Film, Best Director (Gulzar), Best Actress (Tabu) and Best Supporting Actor (Puri), and won 4 awards, including Best Male Debut (Bhardwaj) and R. D. Burman Award (Bhardwaj).

Tabu won her first Best Actress National Award for her portrayal of Virendar Kaur aka Veeran. "Chhod Aaye Hum" was the first Hindi film song sung by KK.

Plot 
The story takes place during the mid-to-late 1980s in the Indian state of Punjab. A violent insurgency is taking place due to Operation Blue Star, Prime Minister Indira Gandhi's assassination, and the subsequent 1984 Sikh Massacre. The story unfolds in a series of flashbacks.

Jaswant Singh Randhawa and his sister Veerendar "Veeran" live with their elderly mother Biji in a village in Punjab. Kripal Singh is Jaswant's childhood friend and Veeran's fiancé, and lives close by with his grandfather. Their peaceful lives are disrupted by the Assistant Commissioner of Police Khurana and Inspector Vohra. They are in pursuit of Jimmy, who allegedly attempted to murder Kedar Nath, a member of the Indian Parliament.

When queried, Jaswant pranks the police by leading them to his dog named Jimmy. Angered by his insolence, Khurana and Vohra take Jaswant into custody for questioning. When Jaswant doesn't return home, Kripal struggles to locate him, visiting police stations in the area, but with no success. Jaswant finally returns after 15 days. He is badly injured with bruises all over. Kripal is enraged as Jaswant was subjected to inhumane police brutality for a harmless prank.

Kripal, unable to obtain help by any legal means to fight police brutality, sets off to find his cousin Jeetay, who has ties with militant groups. He fails to locate him but does get to witness Sanathan planting a time-bomb on a bus. Kripal runs into him again at a dhabha (a highway restaurant). He asks a wary Sanathan to listen to his woes. Sanathan agrees to let Kripal travel with him on his truck, being driven by the "Commander" and carrying sacks of homemade bombs and two militants. Upon arriving at their hideout, Kripal explains his predicament and finds out that the Commander himself killed Jeetay for being a police informer. Fully aware of Kripal's background, family, and predicament, the Commander rebukes Kripal for coming to them as if they were professional killers. He tells him to kill Khurana himself, and the group would protect him.

Kripal slowly earns the respect of the rest of the group. Sanathan explains that Kripal is not fighting for a nationalist or religious cause. He is fighting for his fundamental civil rights and against a system that victimizes innocents and devalues ordinary people. Later in the story, it is revealed that Sanathan is a survivor of the communal violence during the Partition of India in 1947. Also, he lost most of his family during the 1984 anti-Sikh riots. Sanathan claims that it is the ruling class trying to divide society by religion for political gain.

Kripal trains with the group and plots the killing of Khurana. After a year, he assassinates Khurana in a busy marketplace. Before going into hiding, he visits Jaswant and Veeran one final time, both horrified at his deed. When Kripal returns to their hideout, he finds it empty. After staying in hiding, a group member contacts him and signals that he should be ready for travel. He is then taken to the group's new hiding place in Himachal Pradesh by the Commander. The Commander informs Kripal that the police know of his identity in connection to the murder of Khurana, as they could connect the dots from the Jaswant questioning ordeal.

Kripal slowly realizes that there is no return to everyday life and finds solace in the unit's company, which is now preparing for a new mission and awaiting a missile-firing specialist's arrival. When thinking of applying for a local job, Kripal is warned by Sanathan that he is now a big-time terrorist in the eyes of the media and a means of promotion for police officers. One of the group members, Kuldip, narrowly escapes a confrontation with the police while illegally transporting some explosives, sustaining injuries. Terrified by the experience, he pleads to Sanathan to let him go home, promising to emigrate to Canada. Sanathan reluctantly agrees. While the rest of the unit believes Kuldip is heading home, a bomb planted in his backpack explodes and kills him on his way home. Meanwhile, Kripal learns that one of his comrades, Jaimal Singh, is none other than the Jimmy whom the police had been searching.

Soon afterwards, the missile shooter arrives, and Sanathan introduces Veerendar Kaur. Kripal is shocked to find that Veerendar is his fiancée, Veeran. After they finally speak together alone, Kripal is horrified to learn that Jaswant had been taken in for questioning after Khurana's murder. He was beaten viciously and driven to commit suicide in jail. His mother died soon after learning of this tragedy, leaving Veeran alone. After receiving daily visits from Inspector Vohra, Veeran decided to follow in Kripal's footsteps and reunite with him. Kripal and Veeran begin to grow close again.

Veeran is a welcome addition to the household, bringing the simple joys of ordinary life to the band of outlaws and developing a close friendship with the others, especially Sanathan and Wazir. The mission is revealed to be a plot to assassinate MP Kedar Nath, who had survived Jimmy's assassination attempt, as he arrives for a visit to a local Sikh shrine. During their stay together, Kripal and Veeran decide to get married quietly. Veeran quietly steals the cyanide pill from Kripal that each group member has and is supposed to use if ever caught by police.

While visiting the Sikh shrine to begin surveillance, Kripal spots Inspector Vohra, who is in charge of the security arrangements during Kedar Nath's visit. Kripal tracks Vohra to the house where he is staying but, while attempting to kill him, is caught by Vohra and arrested by police. Meanwhile, one of the group members spots Kripal entering Vohra's residence. Arguing that if Kripal had been loyal, he would have taken the cyanide pill to kill himself, Sanathan concludes that Kripal was a police informer. Sanathan also accuses Veeran of helping Kripal and orders her into house arrest. On the day of the mission, Sanathan orders the group to move and tells Wazir to kill Veeran. However, Veeran breaks free and kills Wazir. In the meantime, Jaimal and Sanathan execute the plot. Jimmy is shot dead while stopping Kedar Nath's motorcade on a bridge. Sanathan, as planned, fires the missile to blow up Kedar Nath's car. On the run, Sanathan finds himself being tracked closely, not by the police but by Veeran herself. Veeran lures him into the depths of wood and shoots him dead.

Veeran, who has not been exposed as a member of the group, visits Kripal in prison. She hugs Kripal, and while embracing him, she slips Kripal his cyanide pill and departs. The movie ends with a shot of Kripal lying dead peacefully on his prison bed and a shot of the back of a moving pickup tractor where Veeran is peacefully sleeping upright with a nose bleed, indicating they both took the cyanide pill.

Cast 

 Tabu as Virender Kaur a.k.a. Veeran
 Chandrachur Singh as Kripal Singh a.k.a. Pali
 Om Puri as Sanatan	
 Kulbhushan Kharbanda as Commander
 Kanwaljit Singh as Inspector Vohra
 S M Zaheer as Khurana	
 Raj Zutshi as Jaswant Singh Randhawa a.k.a. Jassi
Banwari Taneja as Kripal Singh's Grandfather
 Jimmy Sheirgill as Jaimal Singh a.k.a. Jimmy
 Ravi Gossain as Kuldeep
 Suneel Sinha as Wazir Singh a.k.a. Wazira
 Amrik Gill as Nanoo
 Navnindra Behl as Veeran's mother

Soundtrack 

The score and soundtrack are composed by Vishal Bhardwaj with lyrics by Gulzar. The CD of the soundtrack features several background pieces from the film.

Release 
Maachis was originally scheduled to be released on 18 October 1996, but was delayed a week to 25 October 1996.

Controversy
Maachis was banned in Malaysia by the censor board on grounds that "it may hurt religious sentiments."

Accolades

Notes

References

External links 

1996 films
1990s Hindi-language films
Films about terrorism in India
Films featuring a Best Actress National Award-winning performance
Films about massacres of Sikhs
Films scored by Vishal Bhardwaj
Films directed by Gulzar
Best Popular Film Providing Wholesome Entertainment National Film Award winners
Insurgency in Punjab in fiction
Fictional portrayals of police departments in India
Fictional portrayals of the Punjab Police (India)